Conus cyanostoma is a species of sea snail, a marine gastropod mollusk in the family Conidae, the cone snails and their allies.

Like all species within the genus Conus, these snails are predatory and venomous. They are capable of "stinging" humans, therefore live ones should be handled carefully or not at all.

Description
The size of the shell varies between 17 mm and 32 mm.

Distribution
This marine species occurs in the tropical Indo-Pacific Region and off Australia (New South Wales, Queensland).

References

 Adams, A. 1855. Descriptions of new species of the genus Conus, from the collection of Hugh Cuming, Esq. Proceedings of the Zoological Society of London 1854:116–119.
 Brazier, J. 1875. Descriptions of ten new species of shells from the collection of Mr C. Coxen, of Brisbane, Queensland. Proceedings of the Zoological Society of London 1875: 31–34
 Smith, E.A. 1892. Descriptions of new species of shells from New South Wales, New Guinea, the Caroline and Solomon Islands. Proceedings of the Zoological Society of London 1891: 486–491 pp., pl. 40
 Hedley, C. 1913. Studies of Australian Mollusca. Part XI. Proceedings of the Linnean Society of New South Wales 38: 258–339
 Wilson, B. 1994. Australian Marine Shells. Prosobranch Gastropods. Kallaroo, WA : Odyssey Publishing Vol. 2 370 pp.
 Röckel, D., Korn, W. & Kohn, A.J. 1995. Manual of the Living Conidae. Volume 1: Indo-Pacific Region. Wiesbaden : Hemmen 517 pp. 
 Puillandre N., Duda T.F., Meyer C., Olivera B.M. & Bouchet P. (2015). One, four or 100 genera? A new classification of the cone snails. Journal of Molluscan Studies. 81: 1–23

External links
 The Conus Biodiversity website
 Cone Shells – Knights of the Sea
 

cyanostoma
Gastropods described in 1855